The Oil and Gas Building, or Oil & Gas Building, is a 14-story building, completed in 1959, at 1100 Tulane Avenue in the Central Business District of New Orleans, Louisiana, in the United States. Its original architects were August Perez / Edward B. Silverstein. It is now listed on the National Register of Historic Places. It was mostly vacant by 2003 and largely abandoned until purchased by a Maryland-based company in 2013 for a reported $7 million.  A mixed-use residential property was originally envisioned, with loft apartments catering to employees of the nearby LSU Medical complex. Canopy by Hilton has now developed a hotel/restaurant property in the building which opened on March 28, 2022. Now known as Canopy By Hilton New Orleans Downtown.

See also
 National Register of Historic Places listings in Orleans Parish, Louisiana

References

1959 establishments in Louisiana
Commercial buildings on the National Register of Historic Places in Louisiana
National Register of Historic Places in New Orleans
Office buildings completed in 1959